The following is a list of notable alumni and faculty of University of Technology Malaysia.

Government and politics

Federal Ministers and Deputy Federal Ministers
 Datuk Seri Ir. Dr. Wee Ka Siong – Malaysian politician and engineer, served as Malaysian Minister of Transport (since 2020), Malaysian Minister in the Prime Minister's Department (2014–2018), Malaysian Deputy Minister of Education (2008–2013) and Member of the Malaysian Parliament for Ayer Hitam, Melaka (since 2004).
 Tan Sri Datuk Seri Panglima Haji Annuar Haji Musa – Malaysian politician, businessman and town planner, served as Malaysian Minister of Communications and Multimedia (since 2021), Malaysian Minister of Federal Territories (2020–2021), Malaysian Minister of Rural Development (1993–1999), Malaysian Minister of Youth and Sports (1990–1993) and Member of the Malaysian Parliament for Peringat (1995–1999) & for Ketereh (since 2013).
 Dato' Seri Hamzah Zainudin – Malaysian politician, served as Malaysian Minister of Home Affairs (since 2020), Malaysian Minister of Domestic Trade, Cooperatives and Consumerism (2015–2018), Malaysian Deputy Minister of Foreign Affairs (2013–2015), Malaysian Deputy Minister of Plantation Industries and Commodities (2009–2013), Malaysian Deputy Minister of Housing and Local Government (2008–2009), Member of the Malaysian Parliament for Larut, Perak (since 2008) and Malaysian Senator (2000–2006).
 Mohd Shahar Abdullah – Malaysian politician, served as Malaysian Deputy Minister of Finance (since 2020) and Member of the Malaysian Parliament for Paya Besar, Pahang (since 2018).
 Dato' Seri Shaziman Abu Mansor – Malaysian politician, served as Malaysian Minister of Works (2009–2013), Malaysian Minister of Energy, Water and Communications (2008–2009) and Member of the Malaysian Parliament for Tampin (1999–2018).
 Datuk Lim Ban Hong – Malaysian politician, served as Malaysian Deputy Minister of International Trade and Industry (since 2020) and Malaysian Senator (2020–2021).
 Sim Tze Tzin – Malaysian politician and engineer, served as Malaysian Deputy Minister of Agriculture and Agro-based Industry (2018–2020), Member of the Malaysian Parliament for Bayan Baru (since 2013) and Member of the Penang State Legislative Assembly for Pantai Jerejak (2008–2013).

Chief Ministers
 Dato' Saarani Mohamad – Malaysian politician, served as Menteri Besar of Perak (since 2020), Member of the Perak State Executive Council in Rural Development (2004–2006); Information, Rural Development, Plantation Industries and Commodities (2006–2008); Rural Development, Poverty Eradication, Plantations dan Welfare (2009–2013); Rural Development, Plantations, Agriculture, Housing and Local Government (2013–2014); Rural Development, Agriculture, Plantations, Information dan Human Capital Development (2014–2018) & Rural Development, Entrepreneur, Co-operatives and Consumer Affairs (2020) and Member of the Perak State Legislative Assembly for Kota Tampan (since 1999).
 Haji Adly Zahari – Malaysian politician, businessman and engineer, served as Chief Minister of Malacca (2018–2020) and Member of the Malacca State Legislative Assemblyman for Bukit Katil (since 2018).

Elected Representatives and politicians
 Chan Ming Kai – Malaysian politician, served as Member of Malaysian Parliament for Alor Setar, Kedah (since 2018), Member of the Perlis State Legislative Assembly for Indera Kayangan (2013–2018) and Member of the Perak State Legislative Assembly for Simpang Pulai (2008–2013).
 Dato' Haji Zainol Fadzi Paharudin – Malaysian politician, served as Adviser to Menteri Besar of Perak (since 2018), Member of Perak State Executive Councillor in Public Utilities, Infrastructure, Energy and Water (2013–2018) & Art, Culture, Youth and Sports (2009–2013) and Member of the Perak State Legislative Assembly for Sungai Manik (since 2008).
 Suhaizan Kayat – Malaysian politician, served as Speaker of the Johor State Legislative Assembly (since 2018).
 Chan Tzun Hei – Malaysian politician, served as Sabah Deputy Youth Chief of Parti Gerakan Rakyat Malaysia (since 2014).
 Mardani Ali Sera – Indonesian politician and lecturer.

Public services and military
 Tan Sri Dato' Sri Azam Baki – Malaysian investigation officer, become the Chief Commissioner of Malaysian Anti-Corruption Commission (since 2020).
 Tan Sri Dato' Seri Panglima Acryl Sani Abdullah Sani – Malaysian police officer, become the Malaysian Inspector-General of Police (since 2021).
 Yapp Syau Yin – Malaysian military pilot and flight instructor.

Academia
 Prof. Datuk Ir. Dr. Wahid Omar – Malaysian lecturer and professor, served as Vice Chancellor of University of Technology Malaysia (2013–2020)

Business and Economics
 Burhanuddin Md Radzi – Malaysian director and publisher, become the founder, managing director and publisher of Les' Copaque Production Sdn Bhd.
 Ganesh Kumar Bangah – Malaysian serial entrepreneur, technology industry leader and startup investor, founded MOL Global and Commerce.Asia.
 Vijandren Ramadass – Malaysian entrepreneur, founded Lowyat.net.
 Dato' Ir. Ts. Dr. Mohd Abdul Karim Abdullah – Malaysian engineer and businessman, managing director and CEO of Serba Dinamik Holdings Berhad.

Authors, writers and journalists
 Dr. Anas Alam Faizli – Malaysian business leader, author and scholar, published the best-seller book, entitled Rich Malaysia, Poor Malaysians: Essays on Energy, Economy and Education.
 Ahmad Lutfi Othman – Malaysian writers, journalists and political activist.

Actors, directors, models and singers
 Melvin Sia – Malaysian actor, model and singer.
 Alvin Chong – Malaysian singer and actor.
 Tunku Norhanis Tunku Salman @Tunku Hanis– Malaysian actress .
 Brandon Wong – Singaporean actor.
 Irma Hasmie Ibrahim – former Malaysian actress , model and now TV host also humanitarian volunteer .
 Lim Boon Wah – Malaysian actor and director.

References